Muneeb-ul-Haq is a Pakistani politician who had been a member of the Provincial Assembly of the Punjab from August 2018 till January 2023.  He is an Alumni of the, National Defense University, American Council of Young Political Leaders,  Maritime Security Workshop-4, and International Academy for Leadership (FNF) Gummersbach.

He is the youngest son of politician and businessman Ch Ikram ul Haq who was elected Member of Provincial Assembly from Okara Punjab in 1985.

Political career

He was elected to the Provincial Assembly of the Punjab as a candidate of Pakistan Muslim League (N) from Constituency PP-189 (Okara-VII) in 2018 Pakistani general election.

References

Living people
Pakistan Muslim League (N) MPAs (Punjab)
Year of birth missing (living people)